Quintero Airport,  is an airport serving Quintero, a Pacific coastal city in the Valparaíso Region of Chile.

Runway 20 has a  paved overrun. Runway 18 has a  paved overrun and a  displaced threshold. Approaches from the north to both runways are over the water.

See also

Transport in Chile
List of airports in Chile

References

External links
OpenStreetMap - Quintero
SkyVector - Quintero
FallingRain - Quintero Airport

Airports in Chile
Airports in Valparaíso Region